Oldfield, old field, old fields or oldfields may refer to:

Old fields
Old field (ecology), land previously cultivated but now abandoned
Old field or Indian old field, abandoned Native American cultivated fields

Places
Oldfield, Missouri, United States
Old Field, New York, a village in Suffolk County, New York, United States
Oldfield, Ontario, Canada
Oldfield River, Western Australia
Oldfields, a house and estate forming part of the Indianapolis Museum of Art, Indiana, United States
Oldfields Ground, a former cricket ground in Uttoxeter, Staffordshire, England
Oldfields, Virginia, an unincorporated community in Botetourt County, Virginia, United States
Old Fields, West Virginia, an unincorporated community in Hardy County, West Virginia, United States
Oldfield, West Yorkshire, England

People
Oldfield (name), list of people called Oldfield

Wildlife
 Oldfieldia, a plant genus in the family Picrodendraceae
 Oldfieldioideae, a former subfamily of Euphorbiaceae now regarded as a family, called Picrodendraceae
 Oldfield clover or hare's-foot clover, Trifolium arvense
 Oldfield mouse or beach mouse (Peromyscus polionotus), a North American species of rodent in the family Cricetidae
 Oldfield mouse, any of the South American species of rodent in the genus Thomasomys in the family Cricetidae
 Old-field toadflax, Nuttallanthus canadensis

Schools
Oldfield Boys' School, former boys' secondary school in Bath, England
Oldfield School, coeducational secondary school in Bath, England
Oldfields School, girls' boarding school in Baltimore County, Maryland, United States

Other
5656 Oldfield, an asteroid